The 1987 Pan Pacific Open was a women's tennis tournament played on indoor carpet courts at the Tokyo Metropolitan Gymnasium in Tokyo in Japan and was part of the Category 4 tier of the 1987 WTA Tour. It was the 12th edition of the tournament and ran from 14 September through 20 September 1987. First-seeded Gabriela Sabatini won the singles title and earned $50,000 first-prize money.

Finals

Singles
 Gabriela Sabatini defeated  Manuela Maleeva 6–4, 7–6(8–6)
 It was Sabatini's 1st singles title of the year and the 3rd of her career.

Doubles
 Anne White /  Robin White defeated  Katerina Maleeva /  Manuela Maleeva 4–6, 6–2, 7–6
 It was Anne White's 2nd title of the year and the 7th of her career. It was Robin White's 2nd title of the year and the 5th of her career.

References

External links
 Official website 
 Official website 
 ITF tournament edition details

Pan Pacific Open
Pan Pacific Open
Pan Pacific Open
Pan Pacific Open
Pan Pacific Open